François Joseph Pierre Deniau (3 October 1936 – 12 January 2014) was a French Roman Catholic bishop.

Ordained to the priesthood in 1961, Deniau was named bishop of the Roman Catholic Diocese of Nevers in 1998. He died in January 2014.

Notes

1936 births
2014 deaths
Bishops of Nevers
People from Neuilly-sur-Seine